Andrei Viktorovich Moiseyenkov (born 5 January 1987) is a Russian former professional football player.

Honours
 Russian Cup finalist: 2007 (played for the main squad of FC Moscow in the competition).

External links
 

1987 births
Living people
Russian footballers
FC Moscow players
Association football defenders
FC Vityaz Podolsk players